A guard rail is a protective boundary feature.

Guard rail may also refer to:
 Guard rails (railroad) installed parallel to trackbed rails, for railway safety
 RC-12 Guardrail, a U.S. Army intelligence-gathering aircraft based on the C-12 Huron
 Roof edge protection, rails installed on roofs to protect construction and roofing workers
 Traffic barrier, installed on roadways for automobile safety